Brewster High School is a high school in Brewster, Washington. The school has about 420 students in the junior and senior high, and 990 students K-12.

Discrimination suit
In October 2005, a group of eight Latino parents filed a discrimination lawsuit in a federal district court. According to the lawsuit, Principal Randy Phillips called a meeting with Hispanic students, in which he told them they showed less respect, scored lower on tests, and fought more than non-Hispanic students. The lawsuit was settled in 2006, and included the formation of a school office of minority affairs.

References

"Parents sue district over treatment of Latinos." Associated Press. 2 November 2005.

High schools in Okanogan County, Washington
Public high schools in Washington (state)